John Morrison (9 November 1909 – 25 May 1992) was a Scottish footballer who played as a left back, primarily for Celtic, where he spent a decade, although he was only a regular starter for four of those years (in the seasons leading up to World War II), gradually displacing the established Peter McGonagle.

Originally a coal miner from the pit village of Croy (which produced several players for Celtic such as Jimmy Quinn and Andy McAtee), Morrison won the Scottish Football League championship in 1935–36, the Scottish Cup in 1937, and four trophies during 1938: the League title in April, the Charity Cup in May, the Empire Exhibition Trophy in June and the Glasgow Cup during the following season in October.

References

1909 births
1992 deaths
Scottish footballers
Celtic F.C. players
Greenock Morton F.C. players
Burnbank Athletic F.C. players
Scottish Junior Football Association players
Scottish Football League players
People from Kilsyth
Association football defenders
Footballers from North Lanarkshire
People from Croy